Chernigovka is a Russian Air Force airbase located near Chernigovka, Primorsky Krai, Russia.

The base is home to the 18th Guards Red Banner Assault Aviation Regiment which flies the Sukhoi Su-25SM under the 303rd Composite Aviation Division, alongside the 319th Independent Helicopter Regiment which flies the Kamov Ka-52 and the Mil Mi-8AMTSh.

The 18th deployed to Luninets Air Base in Belarus with their Sukhoi Su-25's as part of the 2022 Russian invasion of Ukraine.

References

Russian Air Force bases